Zeugma is a literary journal published in St. John's, Newfoundland and Labrador, Canada. First published in February 2006 by Meghan Beresford and Tomasz Mrozewski, Zeugma has grown to publish 400 copies per quarter, and includes primarily Canadian content, with a number of international items. It has .

Content 
Zeugma publishes original creative writing in all genres, in the form of fiction, poetry and non-fiction. Special emphasis is given to works by new authors. The journal has published local, national and international authors.

The journal solicits:
 Original Fiction, Poetry, and Erotica
 Non-fiction, Personal Essays
 Reviews of the Printed and Electronic Word
 Comics, Line Drawings and Photography

Production
Zeugma's covers to date have been designed by Jedediah Baker, and silk-screened by local (St. John's) independent printers and designers Ben Jackson and Lesley Thompson. The editions have been sewn-bound. The content of both issues has been photocopied. All issues are hand-numbered.

Funding 
The journal was awarded a project grant by the Newfoundland and Labrador Arts Council in May 2006 to pay an honorarium to contributing artists for the second and third issues. Zeugma does not sell advertising. It is produced primarily through volunteer labour and in-kind donations, with other costs covered by the sale of copies.

References

External links
Zeugma official site
Newfoundland and Labrador Arts Council

2006 establishments in Canada
Literary magazines published in Canada
Magazines established in 2006